Kathy Butler (born 22 October 1973) is a long-distance runner who competes in the 10,000 metres and marathon, as well as cross country running and road running. Born in Scotland, she has competed internationally for both Great Britain and Canada.

Early life and collegiate career

Butler was born in Edinburgh of English parents and brought up in Edinburgh and the Isle of Wight until her parents emigrated to Ontario, Canada when she was 10. She attended the University of Guelph, Canada before transferring to the University of Wisconsin, USA. In 2004, she was inducted into the University of Wisconsin hall of fame. In 2005, she was inducted into the University of Guelph hall of fame.

As a member of the cross country and track teams at the University of Wisconsin, Butler was a five-time NCAA Champion and a 13-time All-American. In the 1995-96 season, Butler received the Honda Sports Award, given to the top women in collegiate athletics.

Canada
While in college she competed for Canada in the 5,000 metres at the 1996 Olympic Games in Atlanta. She finished seventh in her heat and did not advance to the final.

Great Britain
In 2000, she switched to competing internationally for Great Britain.

In 2001, Butler finished 12th at the World Cross Country Championships (4 k race), won the European Cup 3000m and also placed third in the 5,000 metres at the Goodwill Games in Brisbane, Queensland, Australia.

During the IAAF World Championships Olga Yegorova, who had shown positive for the blood-boosting agent erythropoietin in tests conducted by a Paris lab escaped suspension because procedures were improperly observed, her presence at the World Championships kept Butler out of the World Championship final.

In 2002 Butler missed out on competing for Scotland at the Commonwealth Games after she was diagnosed with osteitis pubis. In 2004, she finished 11th at the World Cross Country Championships (8 km race) in Brussels, winning a bronze medal with the British team. Running for Great Britain at the 2004 Olympic Games in Athens, Butler finished 12th in the 10,000 metres with a time of 31:41.13.

In 2005 Butler won the meet at the Venta de Baños Cross Country. Later in the year she debuted in the marathon with 2:30:01 at the Chicago Marathon.

Butler competed in the 10,000 metres at the 2006 Commonwealth Games, finishing 7th while representing Scotland.

Butler was an assistant coach at both Stanford University and University of Wisconsin. Butler is now coached by former marathon world record holder Steve Jones.

Personal life
In 1994 Butler was diagnosed with Graves' disease, a disorder of the thyroid gland.

Butler has a maple leaf tattooed on her ankle, along with the five-ring Olympic insignia.

Butler lives in Nederland, Colorado in the United States. She is the Head Coach of Run Boulder AC.

Butler is the Chair of USATF Coaching Education as well as a Level 1 and Level 2 Instructor for USATF.

Competition record

Olympics
1996 Atlanta Olympics
5000 m (competing for Canada)

2004 Athens Olympics
10,000 m: 12th. 31:40 (competing for Great Britain)

Other events

 2005 British World Trials - First place (10000) 31:45 
 2004 British Olympic Trials - First place (10000 m) 31:36
 1999 IAAF World Cross Country Championships - 4th Place (4k)
 1997 NCAA Outdoor Track and Field Championship - First place (3000m)
 1996 NCAA Outdoor Track and Field Championship - First place (3000m)
 1995 NCAA Outdoor Track and Field Championship - First place (3000m)
 1995 NCAA Cross Country Championship - First place

Personal bests
1500 metres - 4:07.68 min (1997)
3000 metres - 8.40.97 min (2001)
5000 metres - 15:05.51 min (2004)
10,000 metres - 31:36.90 min (2004)
Half marathon - 71:05 min (2006)
Marathon - 2:28:39 min (2006)

References

External links
Official website

Living people
1973 births
Sportspeople from Edinburgh
Canadian female long-distance runners
British female long-distance runners
Scottish female long-distance runners
Olympic athletes of Great Britain
Olympic track and field athletes of Canada
Athletes (track and field) at the 1996 Summer Olympics
Athletes (track and field) at the 2004 Summer Olympics
Commonwealth Games competitors for Scotland
Athletes (track and field) at the 2006 Commonwealth Games
World Athletics Championships athletes for Great Britain
University of Guelph alumni
University of Wisconsin–Madison alumni
Goodwill Games medalists in athletics
Big Ten Athlete of the Year winners
Competitors at the 2001 Goodwill Games
Wisconsin Badgers women's track and field athletes